Jon Harrison or Jonathan Harrison may refer to:

Jon Harrison, member of the 1971 Oklahoma Sooners football team 
Jon Harrison, actor in the 2009 West End production of Bathhouse: The Musical!
Jonathan Baxter Harrison (1835–1907), Unitarian minister and journalist

See also
 John Harrison (disambiguation)